Nils Gustav von Kantzow (30 August 1885 – 7 November 1967) was a Swedish gymnast  who competed in the 1908 Summer Olympics. He was a member of the Swedish team that won the all-around gold medal. He was born in a noble family and reached the rank of captain in the Swedish Army in 1916.

In 1910 von Kantzow married Carin Axelina Hulda Fock, but they were later separated. Their only child, Thomas von Kantzow, was born in 1913. A few days after their divorce in December 1922, Carin married the German airline pilot Hermann Göring, who later became a leader of the Nazi Party.

References

External links

1885 births
1967 deaths
Swedish male artistic gymnasts
Gymnasts at the 1908 Summer Olympics
Olympic gymnasts of Sweden
Olympic gold medalists for Sweden
Olympic medalists in gymnastics

Medalists at the 1908 Summer Olympics